Signe Toksvig (1891–1983) was a Danish writer. Her articles were published in The New York Times, the Nation, The Atlantic, and other periodicals. She also published several books, including biographies of Hans Christian Andersen and Emanuel Swedenborg. Her life and work, and obstacles she encountered, has also been the focus of scholarship by others. All her writings were in English.

At age 14, Toksvig emigrated with her family from Denmark to the United States.
She graduated from Cornell in 1916, and then worked as an assistant editor at The New Republic.
In 1918, she married the journal's founder, Francis Hackett, an Irish writer and literary critic. They moved to Ireland in 1926 and lived there until 1937, when they moved to Denmark. They spent the Second World War in the United States, but returned to Europe and Denmark in the 1950s.

She is the great aunt of Sandi Toksvig.

Bibliography

Novels

Biographies

Articles

As editor

Critical studies, reviews and biography of Toksvig

References

External links

Signe Toksvig's articles online at The Nation

Danish women writers
1983 deaths
1891 births
Cornell University alumni